Henoonia is a monotypic genus of flowering plants belonging to the family Solanaceae. The only species is Henoonia myrtifolia. It is native to Cuba.

The genus name of Henonia is thought to be in honour of Jacques-Louis Hénon (1802–1872),  a French republican politician. The Latin specific epithet of myrtifolia 'myrtle-leaved' is derived from the Latin myrtus meaning 'myrtle', and folium meaning 'leaf'. It was first described and published in Cat. Pl. Cub. on page 167 in 1866.

References

Solanaceae
Monotypic Solanaceae genera
Plants described in 1866
Flora of Cuba